Greatest Love Songs is a 2002 compilation album by American singer Frank Sinatra, containing 22 love songs.

Track listing
 "My Funny Valentine" (Richard Rodgers, Lorenz Hart) - 2:31
 "What Is This Thing Called Love?" (Cole Porter) - 2:35
 "Like Someone in Love" (Jimmy Van Heusen, Johnny Burke) - 3:10
 "I've Got a Crush on You" (George Gershwin, Ira Gershwin) - 2:16
 "Let's Fall in Love" (Harold Arlen, Ted Koehler) - 2:11
 "You'd Be So Easy to Love" (Porter) - 2:24
 "Fly Me to the Moon (In Other Words)" (Bart Howard) - 2:30
 "In the Blue of Evening" (Tom Montgomery, Tom Adair, Al D'Artega) - 4:03
 "Moonlight Serenade" (Glenn Miller, Mitchell Parish) - 3:26
 "I'm Getting Sentimental Over You" (George Bassman, Ned Washington) - 3:42
 "In the Still of the Night" (Porter) - 3:25
 "You and the Night and the Music" (Arthur Schwartz, Howard Dietz) - 2:36
 "Don't Take Your Love from Me" (Henry Nemo) - 4:05
 "I Hadn't Anyone Till You" (Ray Noble) - 3:44
 "My Heart Stood Still" (Rodgers, Hart) - 3:06
 "The Very Thought of You" (Noble) - 3:34
 "The Way You Look Tonight" (Dorothy Fields, Jerome Kern) - 3:22
 "You Brought a New Kind of Love to Me" (Sammy Fain, Irving Kahal, Pierre Norman Connor) - 2:38
 "Night and Day" (Porter) - 3:37
 "Come Rain or Come Shine" (Arlen, Johnny Mercer) - 4:06
 "All the Way" [with Celine Dion] (Heusen, Sammy Cahn)  - 3:53
 "Strangers in the Night" (Bert Kaempfert, Charles Singleton, Eddie Snyder) - 2:25

Personnel
 Frank Sinatra - vocals
 Celine Dion - vocals
 Count Basie and his Orchestra
 Nelson Riddle - arranger, conductor
 Don Costa
 Robert Farnon
 Sy Oliver
 Johnny Mandel

References

2002 compilation albums
Frank Sinatra compilation albums